Inhibitor of nuclear factor kappa-B kinase subunit alpha (IKK-α) also known as IKK1 or conserved helix-loop-helix ubiquitous kinase (CHUK) is a protein kinase that in humans is encoded by the CHUK gene.  IKK-α is part of the IκB kinase complex that plays an important role in regulating the NF-κB transcription factor.  However, IKK-α has many additional cellular targets, and is thought to function independently of the NF-κB pathway to regulate epidermal differentiation.

Function

NF-κB response 

IKK-α is a member of the serine/threonine protein kinase family and forms a complex in the cell with IKK-β and NEMO. NF-κB transcription factors are normally held in an inactive state by the inhibitory proteins IκBs. IKK-α and IKK-β phosphorylate the IκB proteins, marking them for degradation via ubiquitination  and allowing NF-κB transcription factors to go into the nucleus.

Once activated, NF-κB transcription factors regulate genes that are implicated in many important cellular processes, including immune response, inflammation, cell death, and cell proliferation.

Epidermal differentiation 

IKK-α has been shown to function in epidermal differentiation independently of the NF-κB pathway. In the mouse, IKK-α is required for cell cycle exit and differentiation of the embryonic keratinocytes. IKK-α null mice have a truncated snout and limbs, shiny skin, and die shortly after birth due to dehydration.  Their epidermis retains a proliferative precursor cell population and lacks the outer two most differentiated cell layers. This function of IKK-α has been shown to be independent of the protein's kinase activity and of the NF-κB pathway. Instead it is thought that IKK-α regulates skin differentiation by acting as a cofactor in the TGF-β / Smad2/3 signaling pathway.

The zebrafish homolog of IKK-α has also been shown to play a role in the differentiation of the embryonic epithelium.  Zebrafish embryos born from mothers that are mutant in IKK-α do not produce a differentiated outer epithelial monolayer. Instead, the outermost cells in these embryos are hyperproliferative and fail to turn on critical epidermal genes. Different domains of the protein are required for this function of IKK-α in zebrafish than in mice, but in neither case does the NF-κB pathway seem to be implicated.

Keratinocyte migration 

IκB kinase α (IKKα) is a regulator of keratinocyte terminal differentiation and proliferation and plays a role in skin cancer.

Activation of three major hydrogen peroxide-dependent pathways, EGF, FOXO1, and IKK-α occur during injury-induced epidermal keratinocyte migration, adhesion, cytoprotection and wound healing.    IKKα regulates human keratinocyte migration by surveillance of the redox environment after wounding. IKK-α is sulfenylated at a conserved cysteine residue in the kinase domain, which correlated with derepression of EGF promoter activity and increased EGF expression, indicating that IKK-α stimulatea migration through dynamic interactions with the EGF promoter depending on the redox state within cells.

Other cellular targets 

IKK-α has also been reported to regulate the cell cycle protein cyclin D1 in an NF-κB-independent manner.

Clinical significance 

Inhibition of IκB kinase (IKK) and  IKK-related kinases, IKBKE (IKKε) and TANK-binding kinase 1 (TBK1), has been investigated as a therapeutic option for the treatment of inflammatory diseases and cancer.

Mutations in IKK-α in humans have been linked to lethal fetal malformations. The phenotype of these mutant fetuses is similar to the mouse IKK-α null phenotype, and is characterized by shiny, thickened skin and truncated limbs.

Decreased IKK-α activity has been reported in a large percentage of human squamous cell carcinomas, and restoring IKK-α in mouse models of skin cancer has been shown to have an anti-tumorigenic effect.

Interactions 

IKK-α has been shown to interact with:

 HDAC9,
 AKT1,
 AKT2,
 CTNNB1,
 FANCA,
 IKBKG
 IKK2,
 IRAK1,
 MAP3K14,
 MAP3K7,
 MAP3K8,
 NFKBIA,
 NCOA3,
 PPM1B,
 PRKDC, and
 TRAF2.

References

External links
 

EC 2.7.11